Italy men's national roller hockey team is the national team side of Italy at international roller hockey.

Honours

References

 
Roller hockey
I
European national roller hockey (quad) teams